The East Tennessee Crossing Byway is a  National Scenic Byway in the U.S. state of Tennessee. Established in 2009, it is one of the newest byways in the National Scenic Byway system.  The scenic byway traverses mostly along an unsigned concurrency of U.S. Route 25E/State Route 32 (US 25E/SR 32) in East Tennessee.

Route description
The byway begins Cocke County at the Tennessee–North Carolina state line along US 25 in Cherokee National Forest. Northbound, the byway crosses the French Broad River twice before reaching the unincorporated community of Del Rio. Departing Del Rio, the byway crosses the Pigeon River and enters the city of Newport. The byway ends its unsigned concurrency (road) with US 25 and begins its concurrency with US 25E/SR 32. It exits Cocke County and enters Jefferson County after crossing Douglas Lake near the unincorporated community of Leadvale.

The byway then goes through White Pine, until reaching the Interstate 81 (I-81) overpass at exit 8. It then enters Morristown in Hamblen County. In Morristown, the byway connects travelers to the city's central business district, College Square Mall, and Walters State Community College via SR 160 and US 11E (Morris Boulevard, Andrew Johnson Highway). The byway then exits the Morristown–Hamblen area after crossing Cherokee Lake on the Olen R. Marshall Bridge, entering Bean Station in Grainger County.

In Bean Station, the byway gives scenic views of the Mooresburg Valley and Cherokee Lake. Near the town's central business district, the byway is joined with US 11W/SR 1 via trumpet interchange. The concurrency to US 11W continues until reaching Briar Fork Creek at the base of Clinch Mountain, where US 11W splits off and heads west along the Richland Valley towards Knoxville, and the byway northbound into Poor Valley ascending the southern slope of Clinch Mountain.

The byway traverses by a scenic overlook and through Bean Gap before descending down Clinch Mountain's northern slope towards the unincorporated community of Thorn Hill at the intersection of SR 131. After leaving Thorn Hill, the byway crosses over the Clinch River and enters Claiborne County.

In Claiborne County, the byway first enters the unincorporated community of Springdale, winding through the rolling hills of rural Claiborne County before entering Tazewell. In Tazewell, the byway bypasses the town's central business district and heads north. It crosses over the Powell River and enters Harrogate. The byway offers views of the Cumberland Gap, and access to Lincoln Memorial University before exiting Harrogate. It then bypasses the downtown area of Cumberland Gap, and enters the Cumberland Gap Tunnel, where the East Tennessee Crossing Byway ends.

History

What is now the East Tennessee Crossing Byway was supposedly first traversed by Native Americans, long before the area was settled by European pioneers. During this period, the route was considered a part of the Cherokee Warriors' Path. Most notably, the Cumberland Gap to Bean Station section of the route was used as a pathway to Kentucky on famous pioneer and settler, Daniel Boone's Wilderness Road.

In 1915, the Cumberland Gap to Morristown section was designated a part of the Dixie Highway, one of the routes in the National Auto Trail system, which was one of the earliest highway systems developed in the United States.

Through-out the early to mid-20th century, the route from the Cumberland Gap to Tazewell, along with SR 33 from Tazewell to Knoxville, was part of the infamous Thunder Road, which was used by bootleggers to illegally transport and trade moonshine. The story was later fictionally adapted into a 1958 crime-drama film and song of the same name.

Based on the overall historical significance and proximity to historic sites such as the tavern once lived in by Davy Crockett in Morristown, the Battle of Bean's Station site in Grainger County, and the Appalachian Trail in the Cherokee National Forest, many local historians called for US 25E and US 25 to the North Carolina state line to become a scenic byway. After a lengthy nomination and funding process, the efforts proved successful, as the East Tennessee Crossing National Scenic Byway was officially established in late 2009.

Major intersections

References

External links 

 

East Tennessee Crossings Byway
Transportation in Cocke County, Tennessee
Transportation in Jefferson County, Tennessee
Transportation in Hamblen County, Tennessee
Transportation in Grainger County, Tennessee
Transportation in Claiborne County, Tennessee
U.S. Route 25